Jason Knight is an American politician. He serves as Democratic member for the 67th district of the Rhode Island House of Representatives.

In 2017, Knight won the election for the 67th district of the Rhode Island House of Representatives, succeeding Jan Malik, whom he defeated in the Democratic primary in 2016.

References 

Living people
Place of birth missing (living people)
Year of birth missing (living people)
Democratic Party members of the Rhode Island House of Representatives
21st-century American politicians